Acer yui is an uncommon Asian species of maple. It has been found only in Gansu and Sichuan Provinces in western China.

Acer yui is a small deciduous tree up to 7 meters tall with gray bark. Leaves are non-compound, up to 7 cm wide to 2.5 cm across, thin, with 3 lobes but no teeth.

References

External links
line drawing for Flora of China

yui
Plants described in 1934
Flora of Sichuan
Flora of Gansu